The Shedd Park Fieldhouse is the historic fieldhouse in Shedd Park, a public park in the South Lawndale community area of Chicago, Illinois. John G. Shedd, for whom the park and fieldhouse are named, gave the city the land for the park. The Prairie School building was designed by William Drummond and built in 1917. The brown brick building features limestone trim. A Prairie School gymnasium designed by Michaelsen and Rognstad was added to the building in 1928.

The fieldhouse was added to the National Register of Historic Places on December 30, 1974, and was designated as a Chicago Landmark on February 11, 2004.

References

Park buildings and structures on the National Register of Historic Places in Illinois
Prairie School architecture in Illinois
Buildings and structures completed in 1917
Buildings and structures on the National Register of Historic Places in Chicago
Chicago Landmarks